Fay Roope (born Winfield Harding Roope; October 20, 1893 – September 13, 1961) was a Harvard graduate and a character actor who appeared in American theater in New York City from the 1920s through 1950, and in American film and television from 1949 through 1961.

Early life
Winfield Harding Roope was born October 20, 1893 in Allston, Massachusetts, near Boston, the only son of George Winfield Roope and Lucie Mattie Jacobs, a wealthy couple listed in Newton's Blue Book. He "prepared" at Stone School for Boys, a Boston boarding school, and attended Harvard University from 1912 to 1916. During his time there he appeared in varied dramatic and musical roles in school productions. He received a Bachelor of Arts degree from the university in 1916.

Acting career
He began acting professionally on stage in New York City in the early 1920s, and continued to do so for almost thirty years, appearing both off and on Broadway. He moved into film around 1950. He did do some television in the early 1950s, but did most of his television work in dramas during the last five years of his life, from 1955 on.

Broadway career
His first appearance on the Broadway stage was in the musical revue One Helluva Night, on June 4, 1924. From September 5, 1924 until September 12, 1925 he played Lieutenant Aldrich in the drama What Price Glory?. From March 30, 1949 to April 9, 1949 he played Colonel Jared Rumley in the comedy The Biggest Thief in Town. His last appearance on Broadway was in the first Broadway production of The Madwoman of Chaillot, June 13–25, 1950.

Film career
Fay Roope portrayed generals, admirals, and colonels in such movies as From Here To Eternity, Rock Hudson's Seminole, the Gary Cooper comedy You're in the Navy Now, and the original version of the science-fiction classic film The Day the Earth Stood Still. He played Mexican president Porfirio Díaz in the movie Viva Zapata!.

Film roles

 You're in the Navy Now (1951) - Carrier Admiral (uncredited)
 The Frogmen (1951) - Adm. Dakers (uncredited)
 The Day the Earth Stood Still (1951) - Major General (uncredited)
 Callaway Went Thataway (1951) - Tom Lorrison
 Indian Uprising (1952) - Maj. Gen. George Crook (uncredited)
 Viva Zapata! (1952) - President Porfirio Díaz
 My Six Convicts (1952) - Warden George Potter
 Deadline - U.S.A. (1952) - Surrogate Court Judge McKay (uncredited)
 Carbine Williams (1952) - Ed - District Attorney
 Young Man with Ideas (1952) - Kyle Thornhill
 The Brigand (1952) - Mons. De Laforce
 Washington Story (1952) - Caswell
 Assignment – Paris! (1952) - American Ambassador (uncredited)
 The Clown (1953) - Doctor Strauss
 Down Among the Sheltering Palms (1953) - Colonel Thomas B. Richards (uncredited)
 All Ashore (1953) - Commodore Stanton
 Seminole (1953) - Col. Zachary Taylor
 The System (1953) - Roger Stuart
 The Charge at Feather River (1953) - Lt. Col. Kilrain
 From Here to Eternity (1953) - Gen. Slater (uncredited)
 Clipped Wings (1953) - Col. Davenport
 A Lion Is in the Streets (1953) - Governor Charles Snowden (uncredited)
 Man of Conflict (1953) - Ed Jenks
 Alaska Seas (1954) - Captain Walt Davis
 The Lone Gun (1954) - Mayor Booth
 Living It Up (1954) - Man
 The Black Dakotas (1954) - John Lawrence
 Naked Alibi (1954) - Commissioner F.J. O'Day
 The Last Time I Saw Paris (1954) - City Editor (uncredited)
 The Atomic Kid (1954) - Gen. Lawlor
 Ma and Pa Kettle at Waikiki (1955) - Fulton Andrews
 The Proud Ones (1956) - Markham
 The Rack (1956) - Col. Dudley Smith
 The True Story of Jesse James (1957) - Tom Trope (uncredited)
 The FBI Story (1959) - Dwight McCutcheon

Television career
Faye Roope played judges in Raymond Burr's Perry Mason TV series, had a continuing role as Mr. Botkin in the long-lasting western Gunsmoke, and appeared as an older man of authority in many TV Westerns of the 1950s. He played the old-west hanging judge in the classic 1960 Twilight Zone time-travel episode Execution, and appeared in many of the classic drama anthology shows of American television's Golden Age.

Roles in television episodes

 The Philco Television Playhouse
 The Beautiful Bequest (1949)
 The Ford Television Theatre
 Junior (1952)
 Mr. & Mrs. North
 Till Death Do Us Part (1952) - Edward Barry
 House Behind the Wall (1953) - Richard Burton
 Fireside Theatre
 Grey Gardens (1953) - Justin
 Racket Squad
 The Knockout (1951) - Clayton Carswell
 The Strange Case of James Doyle (1952) - Jim Doyle
 Sting of Fate (1953) - Albert (Husband)
 The Lone Ranger
 Message to Fort Apache (1954) - Colonel Gaines
 City Detective
 The Blonde Orchid (1954) - Police Commissioner Ralph
 The Public Defender
 The Case of the Parolee (1954) - Mr. Marshall
 Climax!
 A Man of Taste (1955)
 The Millionaire
 The Jerome Wilson Story (1955) - Dr. Tom Evans
 Screen Directors Playhouse
 Want Ad Wedding (1955) - Reverend Walker
 Studio 57
 Cubs of the Bear (1954) - Amos Harlock
 The Senorita and the Texan (1955) - Don Luis
 Soldiers of Fortune
 The General (1955) - General DeSaba
 Celebrity Playhouse
 Tantrum Size 12 (1956)
 Ford Star Jubilee
 The Day Lincoln Was Shot (1956)
 Broken Arrow
 Indian Medicine (1957) - Tyoe
 Tales of Wells Fargo
 The Inscrutable Man (1957) - Mr. Harper
 Zane Grey Theater
 The Bitter Land (1957) - Morgan Batterson
 Schlitz Playhouse of Stars
 The Lonely Wizard (1957) - Dr. Elliott
 The Californians
 The Search for Lucy Manning (1957)
 Code 3
 The Man with Many Faces (1957) - Dr. Matthews
 Panic!
 Child's Play (1957) - Charlie Jennings
 Dr. Hudson's Secret Journal
 Dr. Means' Surgery (1955) (as Fay Roupe) - Chairman
 Love in White Shoes (1957)
 The Adventures of Jim Bowie
 Bayou Tontine (1957) - Etienne Broussard
 Curfew Cannon (1958) - Etienne Rochambeau
 The Life and Legend of Wyatt Earp
 Frontier Journalism was Fearless (1955) - Colonel Josh Clanton
 The Frontier Theatre (1956) - Older Actor
 The Underdog (1958) - Uncle George Jackson
 The Court of Last Resort
 The Westover Case (1958) - Dan Tackberry
 Dragnet
 The Big Oskar (1958) - Oskar Hovejg
 Perry Mason
 The Case of the Gilded Lily (1958) - Judge Kyle
 The Case of the Hesitant Hostess (1958) - Judge
 The Rifleman
 The Brother-in-Law (1958) - Jeff Stacey
 The Legacy (1959) - Doc Burrage
 The Spiked Rifle (1959) - Barton
 Panic (1959) - Doc Burrage
 Bonanza
 The Magnificent Adah (1959) - Castellan
 Gunsmoke
 Change of Heart (1959) - Mr. Botkin
 Murder Warrant (1959) - Mr. Botkin
 The F.U. (1959) - Mr. Botkin
 Have Gun, Will Travel
 Killer's Widow (1958) - E.J. Randolph
 Alaska (1959) - Wade
 Rawhide
 Incident on the Edge of Madness (1959) - Mayor Haslip
 Tate
 The Gunfighters (1960) - Keefer
 The Chevy Mystery Show
 Fear Is the Parent (1960) - Dow
 The Texan
 Desert Passage (1958) - Ben Atkins
 The Accuser (1960) - Mr. Benton
 The Twilight Zone
 Execution (1960) - Judge
 Cheyenne
 Gold, Glory and Custer - Prelude (1960) - Commissioner Brady
 Gold, Glory and Custer - Requiem (1960) - Commissioner Brady
 The Tom Ewell Show
 The Old Magic (1961) - Mr. Dutton (final appearance)

Personal life
Fay Roope married Marie Teresa Roope. They had two children, Martha and George, and many grandchildren. He died on September 13, 1961, in Port Jefferson, New York, aged 67.

References

External links
 
 

1893 births
1961 deaths
Harvard University alumni
Male actors from Boston
American male stage actors
American male film actors
American male television actors
20th-century American male actors